Cupar is a town 75 kilometres northeast of Regina in the Canadian province of Saskatchewan. Cupar is settled on the flat plains 45 kilometres north of the scenic Qu'Appelle Valley. Known for its remarkable hockey history, it is often called the Home of Eddie Shore, as the legendary NHL defenceman was raised there.

Cupar is the home of artist Jacqueline Berting. The Berting Glass studio is located north of town. One of her best known works is The Glass Wheatfield, encompassing 1,400 waist-high glass wheat stalks, each piece individually hand cut and lamp worked.  Berting calls her work "a salute to the Canadian farmer".

The town hosts the Cupar Gopher Drop, a unique lottery held every summer.  Stuffed toy gophers (Richardson's ground squirrels) labelled with numbers are dropped from a hot-air balloon along with numbered gopher holes.  The "owner" of the gopher that lands nearest Hole 1 wins first prize, and so on.

History
Cupar became a village in 1905. It was named by a Canadian Pacific Railway official after the town of Cupar in Fife, Scotland. The town celebrated its centennial in 2005.

Sports
Cupar has a swimming pool, ice rink, curling, rink, ball diamonds, and golf. The Cupar Canucks of the senior men's Highway Hockey League play here.

Rivalry with Southey
Cupar has a fierce rivalry with the nearby town of Southey, Saskatchewan, especially in the field of sports. Without exception, there is a certain amount of animosity between individuals of the towns. However, the towns are close-knit, and inter-town sports teams are made often combining players from both towns.

Demographics 

Climate

Notable people 

 Glen Hart, former member of the Legislative Assembly of Saskatchewan
 Mitch Pechet, ice hockey right winger
 Eddie Shore, ice hockey defenceman
 George Joseph Trapp, former member of the Legislative Assembly of Saskatchewan
 Rob Tudor, ice hockey centre
 Arnold Tusa, former member and speaker of the Legislative Assembly of Saskatchewan

See also
 List of communities in Saskatchewan
 List of towns in Saskatchewan
 Jewish Colony in 1901

References

External links

Towns in Saskatchewan
Cupar No. 218, Saskatchewan
Division No. 6, Saskatchewan